Schalke 04 Basketball is a German professional basketball team club in Gelsenkirchen. The team currently plays in the ProA, the German national second division. It is the basketball section of FC Schalke 04.

The basketball department of FC Schalke 04 played in the 1988–89 season in the National Basketball League Basketball Bundesliga and from 2004 for several seasons in the ProA, the second highest basketball league in Germany. 2009 saw the Schalke 04 voluntary withdrawal of Schalke 04 from the ProA.

Following the 2017-18 season, the team was promoted to the national second-tier ProA, after Scanplus Baskets resigned its promotion position.

Honours
2. Basketball Bundesliga
Champions (3): 1977, 1982, 1984
1. Regionalliga West
Champions (4): 1975, 1987, 1995, 2016

Season by season

Roster

Notable players
To appear in this section a player must have either:
- Set a club record or won an individual award as a professional player.
- Played at least one official international match for his senior national team at any time.

References

Basketball teams established in 1974
Basketball clubs in North Rhine-Westphalia
FC Schalke 04